Geethanjali is an Indian Telugu language soap opera premiered on 27 February 2023 airing on GeminiTV and it is available for worldwide streaming on Sun NXT. The show stars Sujitha and Ravikiran in lead roles. The show is an official remake of Tamil television series Sevvanthi which is being aired on Sun TV.

Cast
 Sujitha as Geethanjali
 Ravikiran as Ramu, Geethanjali's husband
 Nathan Shyam as Raghu, Ramu's younger brother 
 Lahari as Poornima, Raghu's wife
 Preethi Kumar as Aishwarya, Ramu and Raghu's sister
 Narasimha Raju as Shivayya (Ramu, Raghu and Aishwarya's father)
 Lakshmi Siddhaiah as Parvathi (Ramu, Raghu and Aishwarya's mother)
 Dubbing Janaki as Ramu,Raghu and Aishwarya's grand mother
 Mansi Joshi as Ramu's first wife
 Master Nidhish as Aravind (Ramu and Geetha's son)
 Baby Riya Manoj as Anjali
 Sumangali as Poornima's father
 Jayanth as Poornima's father
 G V Narayana Rao as Geethanjali's father
 Jayaraman Mohan as Geethanjali's brother
 Archana as Radha

Adaptations

References

Indian television soap operas
Telugu-language television shows
2023 Indian television series debuts
Gemini TV original programming
Telugu-language television series based on Tamil-language television series